Admiralenbuurt or Mercatorbuurt is a neighbourhood of the West borough of Amsterdam, Netherlands. It was constructed in the 1920s. The neighbourhood is bisected by the Admiralengracht. From 1990-2010, it was part of the borough of De Baarsjes; in 2010, it became part of the borough of Amsterdam-West along with the rest of De Baarsjes.

References

Amsterdam-West
Neighbourhoods of Amsterdam